Dakaud Otto Jean-Jacques Domoraud (born 1 March 1981) is a Ivorian former professional footballer who played as a defender.

Personal life
He is the younger brother of Cyril and Gilles.

References

External links
 
 

1981 births
Living people
People from Man, Ivory Coast
Ivorian footballers
Ivory Coast international footballers
Association football defenders
Racing Besançon players
FC Sochaux-Montbéliard players
Le Mans FC players
Servette FC players
US Créteil-Lusitanos players
Ligue 1 players
Ivorian expatriate footballers
Ivorian expatriate sportspeople in France
Expatriate footballers in France
Ivorian expatriate sportspeople in Belgium
Expatriate footballers in Belgium
Ivorian expatriate sportspeople in Switzerland
Expatriate footballers in Switzerland